Millhaven Creek is a stream in the municipalities of Loyalist, Lennox and Addington County, and South Frontenac, Frontenac County, and the single-tier municipality of Kingston in eastern Ontario, Canada. It is a tributary of Lake Ontario and is under the auspices of the Cataraqui Region Conservation Authority.

Course
It leaves the lake at the southwest continuing to head southwest, flows under Frontenac County Road 38 at the community of Murvale (where the sign on the road reads "Murvale Creek"), enters the northwest corner of Kingston, and reaches the northeast end of Odessa Lake. The creek enters Loyalist at the lake, leaving that lake at the southwest end and continuing southwest.

Recreation
The Purdy water access point, for launching canoes and other small craft, is located on the creek at Murvale.

References

Rivers of Frontenac County
Rivers of Lennox and Addington County
Landforms of Kingston, Ontario